James Patrick Connors (born October 1946) is an American politician who served as the 28th Mayor of Scranton, Pennsylvania, for twelve years from 1990 until 2002.

Career 
Connors worked as Scranton's Director of Community Development for four years prior becoming mayor in 1990.

Connors switched his party affiliation from Democratic to Republican prior to running for Mayor of Scranton in 1989. He won the 1989 mayoral election, defeating Democrat Jerry Notarianni to win the first of three consecutive terms. Connors received approximately 15,000 votes, while Notarianni placed second with 13,500 votes.

Connors supported Ed Rendell's successful gubernatorial candidacy in 2002. In 2003, Pennsylvania Governor Rendell appointed Connors as the deputy director of his Northeastern Pennsylvania office. Connors retired from the position at the end of 2009 to focus on his family and volunteer work.

References

Living people
Mayors of Scranton, Pennsylvania
Pennsylvania Democrats
Pennsylvania Republicans
Place of birth missing (living people)
Date of birth missing (living people)
1946 births